Lutterworth is a town in Leicestershire, England.

Lutterworth may also refer to:

Lutterworth, Ontario
The Lutterworth Press, a British publishing house